Franz Skutsch (6 January 1865 – 29 September 1912) was a German classical philologist and linguist born in Neisse. He was the father of classical philologist Otto Skutsch (1906-1990).

He studied classical philology and Indo-European studies at the Universities of Heidelberg and Breslau, where he was a student of Georg Wissowa (1859-1931). In 1888 he earned his doctorate at the University of Bonn, later obtaining his habilitation at Breslau in 1890. In 1896 he became a full professor at the University of Breslau and the successor to Friedrich Marx (1859-1941).

Skutsch is remembered for his expert linguistic/philological treatment of the Roman playwright Plautus, being the author of the acclaimed "Plautinisches und Romanisches" (1892). With linguist Paul Kretschmer (1866-1956) he was co-founder of the journal Glotta. 

He was an honorary member of the Gesellschaft der Wissenschaften in Athen (Society of Sciences in Athens), and a corresponding member of the Bavarian Academy.

Selected written works 
 Plautinisches und Romanisches. Forschungen zur lateinischen Grammatik und Metrik (Plautine and Romanesque; Research on Latin grammar and metrics), volume 1, 1892. 
 Aus Vergils Frühzeit (From the early days of Virgil), 1901. 
 Gallus und Vergil (Cornelius Gallus and Virgil), 1906. 
 Kleine Schriften (Smaller works; edited by Wilhelm Kroll), 1914.

References 
 This article is based on a translation of an equivalent article at the German Wikipedia, sources including "Skutsch, Franz" @ NDB/ADB Deutsche Biographie.

1865 births
1912 deaths
19th-century German people
19th-century philologists
German classical philologists
Academic staff of the University of Breslau
Silesian Jews
People from Nysa, Poland
People from the Province of Silesia